Pont-Landry is a community in Gloucester County, New Brunswick, located at the junction of Inkerman, Saint-Isidore, and Saumarez Parishes. It was grouped with the communities of Boishébert, Gaspereau, and Losier Settlement in 1986 to form the local service district of Pont Landry, which was annexed by the Regional Municipality of Grand Tracadie–Sheila in 2014.

History

Notable people

See also
List of communities in New Brunswick

References

Designated places in New Brunswick
Former municipalities in New Brunswick
Neighbourhoods in Grand Tracadie-Sheila